Eric Washington may refer to:

 Eric Washington (basketball) (born 1974), American basketball player
 Eric Washington (American football) (born 1969), American football coach
 Eric T. Washington (born 1953), District of Columbia judge